Good Time Oldies is a 24-hour music format offered to local radio stations across the country that was originally produced by Jones Radio Networks. After the sales of Jones Radio Networks to Dial Global in 2008, the format was absorbed into D.G.`s "Kool Oldies" format.  However, due to radio stations demand, the Good Time Oldies format was brought to Dial Global.  The format was programmed by program director Jon Holiday from 1994 through 2003. 

Good Time Oldies targets a key demographic of white men age 50 to 64. The majority of the network's playlist is from the 1960s and 70s with scattered tunes from the 50s and 80s.

Jones Radio Networks was purchased by Triton Media Group, and "Good Time Oldies" was merged to Dial Global's "Kool Gold" network and then quickly brought back as Good Time Oldies due to affiliate demand.  It is also available through the Dial Global "local" division as well.

D.J.s on the Good Time Oldies feed included Jay "The Fox That Rocks" Fox, Gary Outlaw and Dave Micheals "Dave's Diner" which first aired on the G.T.O. feed in 1992.

In spring 2014, Westwood One (which merged with Dial Global in 2012) announced that a network branded as Good Time Oldies would replace The True Oldies Channel beginning in June. (Cumulus lost the rights to the True Oldies Channel after its host, founder and owner, Scott Shannon, left the company in February, taking the format with him a few months later.) Good Time Oldies was restocked primarily with talent from Cumulus's "Classic Hits Format", including Maria Danza and "Smokin" Kevan Browning. Good Time Oldies is the 1st joint format venture between Cumulus and its latest acquisition, Westwood One. As of 2020, the station is still used today

External links 

- Network information page from Westwood One

Radio formats
American radio networks
Defunct radio networks in the United States